The European Lawyer was an independent monthly business magazine and website covering the legal profession in Europe. The magazine was launched in 2000. It was acquired in 2009 by Futurelex and published its 100th edition in 2010. The magazine covered news, features and analysis of the legal community. In 2011 The European Lawyer Reference Series was sold by Futurelex to Thomson Reuters. In 2012 The European Lawyer magazine became part of The Global Legal Post, which is also owned by Futurelex.

Patrick Wilkins was the editor-in-chief and the publisher of the magazine between its start in 2000 to 2009. In 2004 The European Lawyer also began publishing a series of legal reference books.

References

External links
 WorldCat record

2000 establishments in the United Kingdom
2012 disestablishments in the United Kingdom
Business magazines published in the United Kingdom
Defunct magazines published in the United Kingdom
Independent magazines
Legal magazines
Magazines established in 2000
Magazines disestablished in 2012
Magazines published in London
Monthly magazines published in the United Kingdom